Steggall is a surname, and may refer to:

 Andy Steggall, English television sports presenter, producer and filmmaker
 Barry Steggall (born 19 August 1943), Australian politician
 Charles Steggall (3 June 1826 – 7 June 1905), English hymn writer and composer
 John Edward Aloysius Steggall (1855-1935), English mathematician
 Zali Steggall (born 16 April 1974), Australian skier
 Zeke Steggall (born 1971), Australian Olympic snowboarder